Berga is a municipality in the Mansfeld-Südharz district, Saxony-Anhalt, Germany.

The municipality consists of three villages:

 Berga
 Bösenrode
 Rosperwenda

Berga-Kelbra station, which is on the Halle–Hann. Münden railway is located in Berga.

References

Mansfeld-Südharz